Duke Street is a street crossing the western half of Oxford Street, London and connecting Wigmore Street and Grosvenor Square.  It is best known as the setting for the TV series The Duchess of Duke Street and has been the headquarters of the Artists' Rifles, a regiment of the British Army Reserve, since 1880.

It is often confused with the relatively nearby central London location Duke Street, St James's which connects Piccadilly and King Street, intersecting Jermyn Street, and is the location of the Cavendish Hotel, which was the real life inspiration for the fictional hotel in The Duchess of Duke Street.

See also
 9 & 11 Duke Street
 Brown Hart Gardens

References

'Duke Street Area: Introduction', Survey of London: volume 40: The Grosvenor Estate in Mayfair, Part 2 (The Buildings) (1980), pp. 86-87

External links

Streets in the City of Westminster